Clownhead is the fourth studio album by American accordion band Those Darn Accordions, released on August 10, 1999 by Globe Records.

Overview
Like most of TDA's discography, Clownhead features an eclectic assortment of genres, ranging from rock and pop to polka, funk, Tex-Mex and tango, as well as covers of Wars "Low Rider" and Devos "Uncontrollable Urge". Clownhead was the final TDA studio album to feature band founder Linda "Big Lou" Seekins, who would leave the band to focus full-time on her other musical project Big Lou's Polka Casserole, as well as the last to feature longtime members Art Peterson and Clyde Forsman, who would retire from the band in 2000 at the age of 84.

The Memphis Flyer, in a positive review of the album, wrote of the accordion sounds of Clownhead as being "fully integrated as an organic component and no longer jumps out of the mix to call attention to itself. This smoothness adds more complexity to the overall aural picture of Those Darn Accordions! as musicians first, accordion players second. Head honcho Paul Rogers knows exactly what he's doing navigating through some tricky turf, leading the band to areas of respectability where accordions are rarely found", while also praising the humor of the band's lyrics.

Track listing

Personnel
Those Darn Accordions
Linda "Big Lou" Seekins - accordion, background vocals
Patty Brady - accordion, lead vocals (9), background vocals
Clyde Forsman - accordion, lead vocals (8), background vocals
Suzanne Garramone - accordion, bell lyre (7), background vocals
Art Peterson - accordion, banjo (2), background vocals
Paul Rogers - accordion, lead vocals (1-3, 5, 7, 10-13), background vocals
Bill Schwartz - drums, percussion, lead vocals (4), background vocals
Lewis Wallace - bass guitar, acoustic guitar (13), background vocals

Additional musicians
Lee Vilensky - guitar (6)
Ron Borelli - accordion (6, 7)
Laura Rogers - background vocals (12)

References

1999 albums
Those Darn Accordions albums